The Euville light railways (French: Réseaux des carrières Civet-Pommier & Cie et Fèvre & Cie) were an approximately  long light railway with a track gauge  and a  narrow gauge with gauge of  near Euville in the département Meuse in the Grand Est region of France (until 2015 Lorraine).

Operation 
The so-called Tacot with a gauge of 1000 mm connected the quarries near Euville with a quai at the Canal de l'Est (today Canal de la Meuse) and the standard gauge railway station at Sorcy.

Workers, animals and a Decauville steam locomotive were used to push and pull the 600 mm gauge V-tip waggons in the quarries.

References 

600 mm gauge railways in France
Metre gauge railways in France
Closed railway lines
Railway lines in Grand Est